Frostbite is the soundtrack to the 2006 Anders Banke film of the same name. The orchestral score was composed by Anthony Lledo and released in 2006 on MovieScore Media.

Track listing
Music composed by Anthony Lledo.

Credits
 Anthony Lledo - Composer, Score Producer, Orchestration
 Allan Wilson - Conductor
 Torben Kjær - Orchestration
 Svenn Skipper - Orchestration
 Rasmus Hansen - Orchestration
 Zacharias Celinder - Vocal Soloist
 Rasmus Kristensen - Vocal Soloist
 Peter Fuchs - Recording engineer and Mixer
 Martin Roller - Assistant Recording engineer
 Torsten Larsen - Choir Recording engineer
 Paul Talkington - Orchestra Contractor
 Magnus Paulsson - Executive Album Producer

Awards and reception
The score won the 'Best Score' award at Screamfest Horror Film Festival in Hollywood, Los Angeles 2006 and received widely critical acclaim. Veteran film music journalist Randall Larson included the score in his annual Best Film Scores of 2006 list.

Concert performance
Malmö Symphony Orchestra performed music from Frostbite at the 2006 Swedish Film Music concert.

References

2006 soundtrack albums
Horror film soundtracks